KBEX (96.1 FM) was a radio station licensed to Dalhart, Texas, United States, it served the Amarillo metropolitan area. The station was owned by Maria Ceniceros, through licensee Viva Media, LLC.

The current studio's were located at 501 South Polk #110 in Amarillo, Texas, and its transmitter was northeast of Channing, Texas.

The station was assigned the KBEX call letters by the Federal Communications Commission on February 20, 2013. KBEX was the second station to use the KBEX call sign. Prior to 2005, KBEX was typically used as a stock call sign for fictional TV and radio stations in film, radio and television productions until the sign-on of KBEX in Brenham, Texas (which held the calls until 2008) that year.

Viva Media surrendered KBEX's license to the FCC on August 2, 2021, who cancelled it the same day.

In fiction 

 KBEX-TV (in film)
 Birds of Prey
 Dawn of the Dead (as a Milwaukee TV station)
 Moving Violation
 Runaway
 KBEX-TV (in television)
 Barnaby Jones
 Brady Bunch
 Cannon (in "Perfect Fit For A Frame")
 Charlie's Angels
 Columbo (Season 2, Episode 6)
 Crazy Like a Fox (Channel 6, San Francisco)
 Dante's Peak (Channel 5)
 Emergency!
 Here's Lucy (in "Milton Berle is the Life of the Party") 
 MacGyver (as TV and radio)
 Mannix
 Mission: Impossible
 The Rockford Files (in "The No-Cut Contract")
 Starsky & Hutch
 The Streets of San Francisco (in "Flags of Terror")
 $weepstake$ (Channel 6, Hollywood) 
 Walker, Texas Ranger
 What's Happening!!

References

External links

BEX
Regional Mexican radio stations in the United States
Radio stations established in 1966
1966 establishments in Texas